Charles Kemper (September 6, 1900 – May 12, 1950) was an American character actor born in Oklahoma. The heavy-set actor was for decades a successful stage actor.

Movie career
Like many actors in New York, Kemper worked in short comedies filmed at the Astoria Studios. In 1937 he was signed by Educational Pictures as a leading comic, playing timid characters in the tradition of Educational's silent-era star Lloyd Hamilton. He soon became a foil for Educational's newest find Danny Kaye, who was then a dialect comedian. Kemper and Kaye might have continued in these miniature sketches, but the studio ceased production in mid-1938.

Kemper pursued a career in Hollywood, beginning in 1945, as a character actor. Kemper had memorable supporting roles in films including The Southerner (1945), Scarlet Street (1945), Gallant Journey (1946), The Shocking Miss Pilgrim (1947), and the film noir On Dangerous Ground (as Pop Daly, his last film role).

Kemper died at the age of 49 when he was involved in a car accident in Burbank, California.

Filmography

External links

 
 

American male film actors
American male stage actors
Road incident deaths in California
1900 births
1950 deaths
20th-century American male actors
People from Kingfisher County, Oklahoma
Male actors from Oklahoma